Emmitt Earl Thomas (born June 3, 1943) is a former American football coach and cornerback. He most recently served as the defensive backs coach for the Kansas City Chiefs of the National Football League (NFL). He played in college at the now defunct Bishop College. He played professionally for Kansas City Chiefs of the National Football League. He owns the Chiefs all-time interception record with 58, which places him ninth on pro football's all-time list. Thomas was elected to the NFL's Pro Football Hall of Fame after being nominated by the Seniors Committee.

Playing career
Thomas made the Chiefs team as an undrafted free agent from Bishop College in Dallas;
he was an AFL All-Star in 1968 and made the NFL's AFC-NFC Pro Bowl four times (1971, 1972, 1974, 1975) after the Chiefs joined the NFL in the 1970 AFL-NFL Merger. He was also selected All-Pro three times.
In the 1969 season, he led all pro football with 9 interceptions, which he returned for 146 yards and a touchdown, helping his team win the AFL Championship and the fourth and last AFL-NFL World Championship Game, which the Chiefs won 23-7 over the NFL champion Vikings.  Thomas recorded an interception in the Kansas City victory.  In 1974, he led the NFL in interceptions (12), return yards (214), and return touchdowns (2).

Thomas retired from playing after 13 seasons; he finished his pro football career with 58 interceptions, which he returned for 937 yards and five touchdowns.  He also recovered four fumbles, gained 64 yards returning punts, and returned 29 kickoffs for 673 yards.  He played in 181 career games, tying  for the fifth-most in club annals, and his 58 interceptions are a franchise record.

Thomas was elected to the Pro Football Hall of Fame in 2008. He was officially inducted at the Enshrinement Ceremony where his bust, sculpted by Scott Myers, was unveiled on August 2, 2008.

Coaching career

Thomas has been an assistant coach in the NFL since 1981. Before being named interim head coach of the Atlanta Falcons on December 12, 2007 after the resignation of Bobby Petrino, Thomas was the Falcons' Senior Defensive Assistant/Secondary Coach. After Petrino's sudden departure left the team in shambles, Thomas attempted to unite the Atlanta locker room, and was able to lead the Falcons to a season-ending victory over the Seattle Seahawks. On January 24, 2008, new Falcons head coach Mike Smith announced that Thomas would remain on staff as assistant head coach.  Thomas was voted into the Pro Football Hall of Fame along with Darrell Green and Art Monk, two players he coached during Super Bowl runs with the Washington Redskins. On January 13, 2010, his contract expired and was not renewed by the Falcons.

On February 1, 2010, he was hired as the secondary coach of the Kansas City Chiefs. On February 12, 2019, Thomas announced his retirement from coaching.

Head coaching record

*Interim head coach.

Personal life
Thomas resides in Kansas City, Missouri.  He married Jacqueline Heafley in 1983, and they remained married until her death on August 21, 2017. He has one son, Derek, and one daughter, Dedra, from a previous marriage with ex-wife Dianne Thomas. Derek now resides in Las Vegas Nevada doing numerous coaching jobs. Dedra Thomas is currently a legal nurse consultant  in Angleton,TX. Thomas has a total of eight grandkids; Keydron, Keynan, Kierrah, Kyandria, Bailey, Samantha, Jade and Shane.

See also
 List of American Football League players

References

External links
 

1943 births
Living people
American football cornerbacks
Atlanta Falcons coaches
Atlanta Falcons head coaches
Bishop Tigers football players
Central Missouri Mules football coaches
Green Bay Packers coaches
Kansas City Chiefs players
Minnesota Vikings coaches
National Football League defensive coordinators
St. Louis Cardinals (football) coaches
American Conference Pro Bowl players
American Football League All-Star players
National Football League players with retired numbers
People from Angleton, Texas
Players of American football from Texas
Pro Football Hall of Fame inductees
Sportspeople from the Houston metropolitan area
Washington Redskins coaches
African-American coaches of American football
African-American players of American football
Kansas City Chiefs coaches
American Football League players
21st-century African-American people
20th-century African-American sportspeople